No man's land in the Latrun area (NML) was a strip of territory covering , in the area of Latrun. Israel considers the area of the NML to be a part of its state, while Palestinians regard it as a part of the West Bank.

Legal status
The strips of territory known as no man's land in the Latrun and Jerusalem regions were among the territories occupied by Israel following the 1967 war. Both the United Nations and the European Union consider Israeli localities in the Latrun no man's land area to be illegal settlements.

Background
The 1949 Armistice Agreements demarcated the NML by two lines reflecting the respective positions of the two armies at the time of the ceasefire, with the land between the lines defined as no man's land, controlled by neither party.

In 1967, Israeli forces occupied the Latrun area early on the second day of the Six-Day War. On Israeli maps since then, both the Armistice line and the no man's land enclave have disappeared. The Separation Barrier cuts off the entire Latrun area within the Israeli side of the fence. Four settlements were established in the NML area, Kfar Ruth, Lapid, Maccabim and Shilat. The Israeli-Palestinian village of Neve Shalom, founded on a project of creating a model for Israeli-Palestinian communities, was also established in the NML, cultivating land partially leased from the Catholic authorities. Israeli municipal jurisdiction was extended over these five settlements. By 2010 1,200 Israeli settlers had established homes in the area.

According to Raja Shehadeh, Israeli effectively annexed the area of no man's land in 1967. No formal act of annexation exists. In peace negotiations, according to Gideon Biger, the Israeli position has been that they retain as sovereign property half of the NLM, while the other half, while belonging to Palestinians, should remain part of Israel, and the Palestinians compensated for its loss by accepting an area of similar dimensions elsewhere.

See also 
Latrun salient

Notes

Citations

Sources

Disputed territories in Asia
Territorial disputes